Erebia rondoui, the Pyrenees brassy ringlet, is a species of butterfly in the family Nymphalidae. It is found in France and Spain, where it is endemic to altitudes ranging from 1,650 to 2,300 meters above sea level in the Pyrenees.

The wingspan is 30–32 mm. Adults are on wing from June to August in one generation per year.

The larvae feed on Poa and Festuca species. The species overwinters in the larval stage. Pupation takes place in spring.

Taxonomy
It was previously considered as a subspecies of Erebia hispania (endemic to the Sierra Nevada of southern Spain), but molecular studies have demonstrated that these two taxa are different species.

References

Erebia
Butterflies of Europe
Butterflies described in 1908